These are the results of the swimming competition at the 1998 World Aquatics Championships.

Doping
During a routine customs check on Chinese swimmer Yuan Yuan's luggage, enough human growth hormone was discovered to supply the entire women's swimming team for the duration of the championships. Only Yuan was sanctioned for the incident, with speculation that this was connected to the nomination of Juan Antonio Samaranch by China for the Nobel Peace Prize in 1993. Tests in Perth also found the presence of the banned diuretic masking agent triamterine in the urine of four swimmers, Wang Luna, Yi Zhang, Huijue Cai and Wei Wang. The swimmers were suspended from competition for two years, with three coaches associated with the swimmers, Zhi Cheng, Hiuqin Xu and Zhi Cheng each suspended for three months.

Medal table

Medal summary

Men

Legend: WR – World record; CR – Championship record

Women

Legend: WR – World record; CR – Championship record

References

HistoFINA Men
HistoFINA Women

 
1998 World Aquatics Championships
Swimming at the World Aquatics Championships
1998 in swimming